French Beach of Karachi is located half way between Hawkes Bay and Paradise Point, is a small fishing village frequented by Karachi's elite class and known to the locals as Haji Ismill Goth.

References
 Collecting cowries on the beach - The Review Dawn (see paragraph 11)

Beaches of Karachi
Surfing locations in Pakistan